The Dodge Revolutionary Union Movement (DRUM) was an organization of African-American workers formed in May 1968 in the Chrysler Corporation's Dodge Main assembly plant in Detroit, Michigan.

History 
Detroit labor activist Martin Glaberman estimated at the time that the Hamtramck plant was 70 per cent black while the union local (UAW Local 3), the plant management and lower supervision, and the Hamtramck city administration was dominated by older Polish-American workers.

DRUM sought to organize black workers to obtain concessions not only from the Chrysler management, but also from the United Auto Workers. Walter Reuther and the senior leadership had been early supporters of the American Civil Rights Movement; yet in spite of their growing presence in the auto-industry African-Americans rarely rose to positions of leadership within the union. On July 8, 1968 DRUM led a wildcat strike against conditions in the Hamtramck plant. The strike was observed by some 4,000 workers, lasted 2.5 days and prevented the production of 3,000 cars. In the subsequent Local 3 election, DRUM ran as an alternative slate. Although it did not win, the new organization drew notice for its militancy and willingness to challenge the UAW hierarchy.

The "Revolutionary Union Movement" form of organization spread to other Detroit plants: including FRUM (Ford Revolutionary Union Movement) at the Ford River Rouge Plant, and ELRUM (Eldon Avenue Revolutionary Union Movement) at the Chrysler Eldon Avenue plant. These organizations were brought together in the League of Revolutionary Black Workers which formed in June 1969.

As it grew, DRUM faced a crisis of expectations. Auto workers had created an independent organization, but opinions differed about DRUM's future mission. Debates concerned whether DRUM should continue as a reform movement within the UAW or a dual-union which would seek to replace the UAW. The League of Revolutionary Black Workers eventually split between those who wanted to remain focused on the auto industry and those who wished to expand the League into a national political organization. The nationally oriented movement, led by General Baker, retained the organizational name the League and DRUM and was associated with the New Communist Movement. By 1975, however, the plant-level organization was largely defunct. Many members had been fired, and those who stayed often joined other currents in the union reform movement, such as the United National Caucus.

References

Further reading 
 Ann Thompson, Heather. "Whose Detroit? Politics, Labor, and Race in a Modern American City". Cornell University Press, 2001.
 Elbaum, Max. Revolution in the Air: Sixties Radicals turn to Lenin, Mao and Che. 320 pages Publisher: Verso (June, 2002) .
 Georgakas Dan and Marvin Surkin. Detroit, I Do Mind Dying: A Study in Urban Revolution. 254 pages Publisher: South End Press; Revised edition (August 1, 1998) .
 Patel, John. The Dodge Revolutionary Union Movement. Audio CD
 Rawick, George. Working Class Self Activity, Radical America, Vol.3, no.2 (Mar.-Apr. 1969), reprinted in Workers' Struggles, Past and Present: A Radical America Reader, ed. James Green. Philadelphia: Temple University Press. 1983. Hardcover 
 Geschwender, James A. Class, Race, and Worker Insurgency: The League of Revolutionary Black Workers. 250 pages Publisher: Cambridge University Press (1977) .

External links 
 Detroit Revolutionary Movements Collection at the Walter P. Reuther Library of Labor and Urban Affairs at Wayne State University.
 "The League of Revolutionary Black Workers: A Historical Study" by A. Muhammad Ahmad.
 General Baker biography and writings. League of Revolutionaries for a New America speakers bureau.
 Martin Glaberman Internet Archive
 Glaberman, Martin. Dodge Revolutionary Union Movement. International Socialism (1st series), No.36, April/May 1969. Transcribed & marked up by Einde O'Callaghan for the Marxists Internet Archive. Retrieved August 13, 2005.
 Glaberman, Martin. "Workers have to deal with their own reality and that transforms them". Courtesy Endpage.com. Marked up by Einde O'Callaghan for the Marxists' Internet Archive. Retrieved August 13, 2005.
 The League of Revolutionary Black Workers, Arab Americans, and Palestine Solidarity by Lauren Ray

African-American history in Detroit
African-American socialism
African-American working class
Defunct trade unions in the United States
Trade unions established in 1968
Dodge
African-American trade unions
Socialism in the United States
Trade unions in Michigan